Bobowasi Island is an island in Ghana in the Axim Bay of the Atlantic Ocean. There is a lighthouse on the island.

References

External links
 Map of the island

Islands of Ghana
Western Region (Ghana)
Islands of the North Atlantic Ocean